NUSTAR Resort and Casino is a  integrated resort and casino facility on Kawit Point (formerly Kawit Island), South Road Properties (SRP), Cebu City, Philippines. The project, which includes restaurants, bars, a mall, convention center, casino, park, theater, and at least three hotels, is a joint venture of the Cebu City Government and Universal Hotels and Resorts, Inc. The project opened partially in 2022.

History

In a press conference on November 7, 2017, Tomas Osmeña, then the mayor of Cebu City, announced that Universal Hotels and Resorts, Inc. (UHRI), a subsidiary of JG Summit Holdings, had agreed to develop Kawit Point (formerly Kawit Island) in South Road Properties into an integrated resort and casino facility. UHRI would lease the property for 50 years and the city would receive 60% of the annual gross receipts. Osmeña said the project could generate 8,000 jobs and increase the appraisal rates for the lots in the area. Osmeña proposed the project be named Isla dela Victoria after former Cebu City Bantay Dagat project director Elpidio "Jojo" dela Victoria, who was murdered outside his home in the city of Talisay on April 12, 2006, for his role in the fight against illegal fishing.

A five-man committee was formed by Cebu City Council to scrutinize the deal's financial, technical, and legal aspects. A joint venture agreement was signed on August 17, 2018 by Mayor Osmeña and UHRI president Frederick Go., and the project formally broke ground eight days later, on August 25, 2018. Civil works commenced on the first quarter of 2019.

See also
 South Road Properties

References

Buildings and structures in Cebu City
Casinos in the Philippines
Entertainment districts in the Philippines
Landmarks in the Philippines
Mixed-use developments in the Philippines
Resorts in the Philippines